Israel–Philippines relations refers to the bilateral ties between the State of Israel and the Republic of the Philippines.

Full diplomatic relations between the two countries were realized upon the signing of the Treaty of Friendship on February 26, 1958. The Israeli embassy in Manila and the Philippine embassy in Tel Aviv both opened in 1962.

History 

The Philippines voted in favor of UN Resolution 181 recommending the partition of Palestine and the establishment of a Jewish State in 1947. The Philippines was among the 33 countries who supported the establishment of Israel and the only Asian country who voted for the resolution. Israel and the Philippines established full diplomatic relationships in 1957. Embassies were opened in Tel-Aviv and Manila in 1962. In 1997, the two countries signed a Memorandum of Understanding (MOU) institutionalizing the bilateral political dialogue between the respective foreign ministries. The political dialogue is accompanied by cooperation in trade and economy, culture, technical assistance, science, academic exchanges, tourism etc.

On November 28, 2007, the Knesset honored the thirty three countries which supported the UN Resolution 181 in celebration of 60th Anniversary of the State of Israel. The UN resolution, which marked January 27, as a yearly commemoration to honor the Holocaust's victims, was co-sponsored by the Philippines.

In October 2012, Vice President Jejomar Binay embarked on a five-day visit to Israel during which he met with President Shimon Peres in Jerusalem.

In September 2018, President Rodrigo Duterte was in Israel for a four-day visit, making him the first sitting Filipino president to visit the Jewish state. President Duterte seeks to reaffirm the people-to-people ties between the two nations based on their significant shared history.

Economic relations
Trade between Israel and the Philippines continues to grow but remains insignificant compared to Israel's trade industry between Europe and the Americas. Israel's exports to the Philippines remain higher in comparison to the Philippines' exports to Israel. Israeli exports amount to $248,448,918 while Filipino exports amount to $33,929,631 in 2007. The number one exports to each other by both countries are electronics.

In 2004, there were 37,155–50,000 Filipino workers in Israel.

Cultural relations

In 2007, Sister Grace Galindez-Gupana, a Filipino businesswoman and supporter of Israel, financed the installation of a giant Israeli flag to honor 50 years of friendly relations between Israel and the Philippines.

In 2009, the Open Doors Monument was erected in the Holocaust Memorial Park in Rishon Lezion, Israel. It honored the role of the Philippine Commonwealth Government under President Manuel L. Quezon in officially offering safe haven and issuing 10,000 visas to Jewish refugees fleeing the Nazi regime. This was done in coordination with US Commonwealth officials (including High Commissioner Paul V. McNutt and Lt. Col. Dwight D. Eisenhower) as well as the local Jewish-Filipino community. Between 1937 and 1941, approximately 1,200 to 1,500 Jewish refugees (mostly from Germany and Austria) were settled in government-provided housing communities in Marikina. Additional plans were made to increase the visas allocated to 100,000 and to allow the refugees to resettle in the then sparsely-populated island of Mindanao, but these could not be carried out due to the Japanese invasion of the Philippines in December 1941. Quezon's actions were notable because the Philippines was one of the few nations that unconditionally opened its doors to Jewish refugees. Quezon was also one of the few heads of state to openly condemn the Nazi persecution of Jews, prior to the outbreak of World War II.

The Philippine Fair is an annual event in Haifa. In July 2013, the 2-day fair opened at the Castra mall, organized by the Philippine Embassy in Tel Aviv and the Municipality of Haifa. The fair features booths selling Filipino handicrafts and food, as well as a cultural program showcasing traditional Filipino music and dance. A photography exhibition, “Yesterday and Today: A Look at Philippines-Israel Relations through the Years," opened at the mall. Some of the images date to the Philippines’ “Open Door Policy" in the 1930s, when more than 1,200 European Jews fleeing the Holocaust were given a safe haven in the Philippines.

Military ties

In January 2014, the Armed Forces of the Philippines agreed to purchase 28 Israeli armored vehicles.

In May 2018, the Philippine Navy purchased Spike-ER missiles from Rafael Advanced Defense Systems. These are the first surface-to-surface missiles to be mounted on Philippine Navy ships.

The Philippines is known to use a variety of Israeli weapons such as Israeli firearms like Galil and TAR-21. The Soltam M-71 155 mm howitzer is used by the Philippine Army and Marines.

See also
 History of the Jews in the Philippines
 Filipinos in Israel

References

External links
 Israeli embassy in Manila
 Filipino embassy in Tel Aviv
 Telltale signs: Philippines – A Jewish Refuge from the Holocaust
 Israel Chamber of Commerce of the Philippines

 
Bilateral relations of the Philippines
Philippines